Olympiodorus the Younger (c. 495 – 570) was a Neoplatonist philosopher, astrologer and teacher who lived in the early years of the Byzantine Empire, after Justinian's Decree of 529 AD which closed Plato's Academy in Athens and other pagan schools.  Olympiodorus was the last pagan to maintain the Platonist tradition in Alexandria (see Alexandrian School); after his death the School passed into the hands of Christian Aristotelians, and was eventually moved to Constantinople. He is not to be confused with Olympiodorus the Deacon, a contemporary Alexandrian writer of Bible commentaries.

Life
Olympiodorus was the disciple of Ammonius Hermiae at the philosophy school in Alexandria, and succeeded him as its leader when Ammonius died c. 520. He was still teaching and writing in 565, because in his commentary on Aristotle's Meteorology, he mentions a comet that appeared that year. Olympiodorus himself was able to survive the persecution experienced by many of his peers (see, for example, Hierocles of Alexandria), possibly because the Alexandrian School was less involved in politics (for example, the attempts by the Emperor Julian to re-establish Mithraic cults) and also possibly because it was more scholastic and less religious than the Athenian Academy.

He is called "Olympiodorus the Younger" or "The Younger Olympiodorus" in contemporary references because there was an earlier (5th century) Peripatetic philosopher also called Olympiodorus (Olympiodorus the Elder) who also taught in Alexandria.

Writings
Among the extant writings of Olympiodorus the Younger are a biography of Plato, commentaries on several dialogues of Plato and on Aristotle, and an introduction to Aristotelian philosophy.  Olympiodorus also provides information on the work of the earlier Neoplatonist Iamblichus which is not found elsewhere. The surviving works are:

Commentary on Plato's Alcibiades (Σχόλια εἰς τὸν Πλάτωνος Ἀλκιβιάδην)
Commentary on Plato's Gorgias (Σχόλια σὺν θεῷ εἰς τὸν Γοργίαν)
Commentary on Plato's Phaedo (Σχόλια εἰς τὸν Πλάτωνος Φαίδωνα)
Life of Plato (Βίος Πλάτωνος)
Introduction (Prolegomena) to Aristotle's logic (Εἰς τὰ προλεγόμενα τῆς Λογικῆς)
Commentary on Aristotle's Meteorology (Εἰς τὸ πρῶτον τῶν Μετεωρολογικῶν Ἀριστοτέλους σχόλια)
Commentary on Aristotle's Categories (Σχόλια εἰς τὰς Ἀριστοτέλους Κατηγορίας)
Commentary on Aristotle's On Interpretation (Σχόλια εἰς τὸ Ἀριστοτέλους Περὶ Ἑρμηνείας)
a polemical work against Strato

In addition, a Commentary by Olympiodorus is extant on Paulus Alexandrinus' Introduction to astrology (which was written in 378 AD).  Although the manuscript of the Commentary is credited in two later versions to a Heliodorus, L. G. Westerink argues that it is actually the  outline of a series of lectures given by Olympiodorus in Alexandria between May and July 564 AD.  The Commentary is an informative expatiation of Paulus' tersely written text, elaborating on practices and sources.  The Commentary also illuminates the developments in astrological theory in the 200 years after Paulus.

Spurious works
In addition there are three works ascribed to Olympiodorus, but which are now believed to be by other authors:
 An alchemical treatise concerning Zosimus' On the Action, called On the Book Kat’energeian (On the action or According to the action) by Zosimus and on the Sayings of Hermes and the Philosophers (Εἰς τὸ κατ' ἐνέργειαν Ζωσίμου, ὅσα ἀπὸ Ἑρμοῦ καὶ τῶν φιλοσόφων ἦσαν εἰρημένα)
 On the Divine and Sacred Art of the Philosophical Stone (Περί τῆς ἱερᾶς τέχνης τῆς φιλοσοφικῆς λίθου; Latin: De arte sacra lapidis philosophorum)
 A commentary on Plato's Philebus — now thought to be the work of Damascius

Notes

References
 Olympiodorus, Introduction to Aristotle's Categories. [Translated by Sebastian Gertz]. Bloomsbury: London, 2017. .
Late Classical Astrology:  Paulus Alexandrinus and Olympiodorus (with the Scholia of later Latin Commentators).  [Translated by Dorian Gieseler Greenbaum.]  ARHAT , 2001.
"Olympiodorus The Younger." Encyclopædia Britannica from Encyclopædia Britannica Premium Service. <https://www.britannica.com/biography/Olympiodorus-the-Younger> [Accessed September 24, 2017].
L.G. Westerink, "Ein astrologisches Kolleg aus dem Jahre 564," in Byzantinische Zeitschrift, 64, 1971, pp. 6–21.
Bruce M. Metzger, “Ancient Astrological Geography and Acts 2:9-11," W. Ward Gasque & Ralph P. Martin, eds., Apostolic History and the Gospel. Biblical and Historical Essays Presented to F.F. Bruce. Exeter: The Paternoster Press, 1970. Hbk. . pp. 123–133.
 Harold Tarrant, "Olympiodorus and history," in Idem, From the Old Academy to Later Neo-Platonism: Studies in the History of Platonic Thought (Aldershot, Ashgate, 2010) (Variorum Collected Studies Series: CS964).
 Harold Tarrant, "Politike Eudaimonia: Olympiodorus on Plato's Republic," in Idem, From the Old Academy to Later Neo-Platonism: Studies in the History of Platonic Thought (Aldershot, Ashgate, 2010) (Variorum Collected Studies Series: CS964).
 Harold Tarrant, "Restoring Olympiodorus' syllogistic," in Idem, From the Old Academy to Later Neo-Platonism: Studies in the History of Platonic Thought (Aldershot, Ashgate, 2010) (Variorum Collected Studies Series: CS964).
Robert Schmidt, Project Hindsight 
Sebastian R. P. Gertz, Death and Immortality in Late Neoplatonism: Studies on the Ancient Commentaries on Plato's Phaedo, Brill: Leiden, 2011.}

External links

Olympiodorus of Alexandria - Encyclopedia.com
 . Collection includes Olympiodorus' Life of Plato. George Burges, translator (1855).

495 births
570 deaths
5th-century Byzantine people
6th-century Byzantine people
6th-century philosophers
Byzantine philosophers
Byzantine astrologers
6th-century Byzantine writers
Neoplatonists
Commentators on Aristotle
Commentators on Plato
Ancient Roman philosophers
Late-Roman-era pagans
6th-century astrologers
6th-century Byzantine scientists